Moundsmere is a hamlet in Hampshire, England. It is in the civil parish of Preston Candover.

At one time, Moundsmere came under the large parish of Bentworth until its decline in the mid-19th century. Although today, Moundsmere still borders the parish of Bentworth.

History
Moundsmere became part of the dower first of Anne of Cleves and then of Catherine Howard. On the death of Catherine Howard, Henry VIII granted it to Winchester College in part exchange for certain other manors. The college used a manor in Moundsmere as a site of retreat from epidemics. The current Moundsmere Manor was built in 1908-9 by Sir Reginald Blomfield for Wilfred Buckley, a highly successful businessman returning to England from America, on the site he identified following a lengthy search for the perfect position.

References

External links
 Moundsmere Farm Management
 Moundsmere Manor

Villages in Hampshire